The Maple Blues Awards are Canada’s blues awards, "honouring the finest in Canadian blues".  They are the only comprehensive national best in blues awards program.  The program's goal is to promote blues music across Canada, and to recognize outstanding achievement.  The Maple Blues Awards have been presented by the Toronto Blues Society since their inception in 1997.

The nominees are selected by a distinguished panel of some 50+ blues experts. The panel includes radio hosts, journalists, and festival organizers regionally distributed across Canada. Members of the Nominating Panel are not eligible for any of the awards.

Nominees are voted for by blues fans from across the country.  In 2011, the voting process was altered, and the Instrument categories (guitar, harmonica, piano/keyboards, horn, drums & bass) were voted on by the Nominating Panel.  The remainder of the categories were voted on by the public.

The winners of the Maple Blues Awards are announced at the Annual Maple Blues Awards Gala in Toronto, Ontario. This evening is Canada's national annual celebration of homegrown blues talent. The evening also includes musical performances by the Maple Blues Band, composed entirely of Maple Blues Awards winners and nominees.

Current award categories
 Entertainer of the Year
 Electric Act of the Year
 Acoustic Act of the Year
 Male Vocalist of the Year
 Female Vocalist of the Year
 New Artist/Group of the Year
 International Artist of the Year
 Recording of the Year
 Guitar Player of the Year
 Harmonica Player of the Year
 Piano/Keyboard Player of the Year
 Horn Player of the Year
 Drummer of the Year
 Bassist of the Year
 Songwriter of the Year
 Blues Booster of the Year
 Blues With A Feeling Award (Lifetime Achievement Award)

Winners by year

The 1st Annual Maple Blues Awards (1997)

The 2nd Annual Maple Blues Awards (1998)

The 3rd Annual Maple Blues Awards (1999)

The 4th Annual Maple Blues Awards (2000)

The 5th Annual Maple Blues Awards (2001)

The 6th Annual Maple Blues Awards (2002)

The 7th Annual Maple Blues Awards (2003)

The 8th Annual Maple Blues Awards (2004)

The 9th Annual Maple Blues Awards (2005)

The 10th Annual Maple Blues Awards (2006)

The 11th Annual Maple Blues Awards (2007)

The 12th Annual Maple Blues Awards (2008)
In 2008, the late Jeff Healey and his band members won seven of the 17 awards presented.

The 13th Annual Maple Blues Awards (2009)
The Toronto Blues Society held its 13th annual Maple Blues Awards ceremony on January 18, 2010, at the brand new Koerner Hall at The Royal Conservatory of Music in Toronto, Ontario.

The 14th Annual Maple Blues Awards (2010)

The 15th Annual Maple Blues Awards (2011)

The 16th Annual Maple Blues Awards (2012)

The 17th Annual Maple Blues Awards (2013)

The 18th Annual Maple Blues Awards (2014)

The 19th Annual Maple Blues Awards (2015)

The 20th Annual Maple Blues Awards (2016)

The 21st Annual Maple Blues Awards (2017)

The 22nd Annual Maple Blues Awards (2018)

References

External links
 Maple Blues Awards official website
 Official list of Maple Blues Award nominees and winners

Canadian music awards
Canadian blues
Blues music awards
Awards established in 1997
Black Canadian culture